Kullberg is a surname which may refer to:

 Anders Carlsson af Kullberg (1771–1851), Church of Sweden bishop and member of the Swedish Academy - see List of members of the Swedish Academy
 Boo Kullberg (1889–1962), Swedish gymnast in the 1912 Olympics
 Harold Albert Kullberg (1896–1924), American World War I flying ace
 Henrik Kullberg (1891–1953), Finnish politician and farmer
 Jakob Kullberg (born 1976), Danish cellist
 Karl Berndtsson Kullberg (1892–1943), Swedish chess player
 Rolf Kullberg (1930–2007), former governor of the Bank of Finland
 Stephan Kullberg (born 1959), Swedish former footballer

See also
 Andy Kulberg (1944–2002), American bass guitarist and composer